Mackey Rock is an isolated rock on the east side of the Sulzberger Ice Shelf,  southwest of Mount Iphigene, Fosdick Mountains, on the coast of Marie Byrd Land, Antarctica. It was mapped by the United States Geological Survey from surveys and U.S. Navy air photos (1959–65), and was named by the Advisory Committee on Antarctic Names for Steven Mackey, a field assistant with the United States Antarctic Research Program Marie Byrd Land Survey II, summer 1967–68.

References

Rock formations of Marie Byrd Land